Many of New Zealand's birds are endemic to the country, that is, they are not found in any other country. Approximately 71% of the bird species breeding in New Zealand before humans arrived are widely accepted as being endemic.

There is also a smaller group of species are not fully endemic, but are breeding endemic, in that they breed only in New Zealand, but migrate or range elsewhere.

Population status symbols are those of the Red List published by the International Union for Conservation of Nature. The symbols and their meanings, in increasing order of peril, are:

 = least concern
 = near threatened
 = vulnerable
 = endangered
 = critically endangered
 = extinct

Endemic Bird Areas 
BirdLife International has defined the following Endemic Bird Areas (EBAs) in New Zealand:

 Auckland Islands
 Chatham Islands
 North Island of New Zealand
 South Island of New Zealand

In addition the following are classified as secondary areas:

 Antipodes Islands
 Snares Islands and Stewart Island/Rakiura islets

Secondary areas have at least one restricted-range bird species, but do not meet the criteria for EBAs.

List of endemic species 
These species (and subspecies) are found only in New Zealand. They are listed in alphabetical order by common name, with an indicator of their conservation status.

 Antipodes Island parakeet, Cyanoramphus unicolor 
 Antipodes snipe, Coenocorypha aucklandica meinertzhagenae 
 Auckland Island merganser, Mergus australis 
 Auckland Island shag, Leucocarbo colensoi 
 Auckland rail, Lewinia muelleri 
 Auckland teal, Anas aucklandica 
 Bellbird (korimako), Anthornis melanura  
 Black robin, Petroica traversi 
 Black stilt (kakī), Himantopus novaezelandiae  
 Black-billed gull (tarāpuka), Chroicocephalus bulleri 
 Black-fronted tern (tarapirohe), Chlidonias albostriatus 
 Blue duck (whio), Hymenolaimus malacorhynchos 
 Bounty Island shag, Leucocarbo ranfurlyi 
 Brown creeper (pipipi), Mohoua novaeseelandiae 
 Brown teal (pāteke), Anas chlorotis 
 Bushwren (mātuhituhi), Xenicus longipes 
 Campbell Island shag, Leucocarbo campbelli 
 Campbell snipe, Coenocorypha aucklandica perseverance
 Campbell teal, Anas nesiotis 
 Chatham Island bellbird, Anthornis melanocephala 
 Chatham Island fernbird, Megalurus rufescens 
 Chatham island oystercatcher (tōrea tai), Haematopus chathamensis 
 Chatham Island pigeon (parea), Hemiphaga chathamensis 
 Chatham Island rail, Cabalus modestus  
 Chatham Island shag, Leucocarbo onslowi 
 Chatham Island snipe, Coenocorypha pusilla 
 Chatham Island warbler (riroriro), Gerygone albofrontata 
 Chatham parakeet (Forbes' parakeet), Cyanoramphus forbesi 
 Dieffenbach's rail (moeriki), Gallirallus dieffenbachii 
 Fernbird (matata), Megalurus punctatus 
 Fiordland crested penguin (tawaki), Eudyptes pachyrhynchus 
 Foveaux shag (kawau), Leucocarbo stewarti 
 Great spotted kiwi (roa), Apteryx haastii 
 Grey warbler (riroriro), Gerygone igata 
 Hawkin's rail (mehonui), Diaphorapteryx hawkinsi 
 Hodgens' waterhen, Gallinula hodgenorum  
 Huia, Heteralocha acutirostris 
 Kakapo, Strigops habroptilus 
 Kea, Nestor notabilis 
 King shag (kawau), Leucocarbo carunculatus 
 Laughing owl (whēkau), Sceloglaux albifacies 
 Little spotted kiwi (kiwi pukupuku), Apteryx owenii 
 Long-tailed cuckoo (koekoea), Urodynamis taitensis 
 Lyall's wren (Stephens Island wren), Traversia lyalli 
 Morepork()Ninox novaeseelandiae
 Malherbe's parakeet (orange-fronted parakeet) (kākāriki karaka), Cyanoramphus malherbi 
 New Zealand bittern (kaoriki), Ixobrychus novaezelandiae 
 New Zealand dotterel (tuturiwhatu), Charadrius obscurus 
 New Zealand falcon (kārearea), Falco novaeseelandiae 
 New Zealand fantail (pīwakawaka), Rhipidura fuliginosa 
 New Zealand grebe (weweia), Poliocephalus rufopectus 
 New Zealand kaka, Nestor meridionalis 
 New Zealand pigeon (kererū), Hemiphaga novaeseelandiae 
 New Zealand quail (koreke), Coturnix novaezelandiae  
 New Zealand scaup (pāpango), Aythya novaeseelandiae 
 North Island brown kiwi, Apteryx mantelli 
 North Island kōkako, Callaeas wilsoni 
 North Island piopio, Turnagra tanagra 
 North Island robin (toutouwai), Petroica longipes 
 North Island saddleback (tīeke), Philesturnus rufusater 
 North Island snipe, Coenocorypha barrierensis 
 North Island takahē (mōho), Porphyrio mantelli 
 Okarito brown kiwi (rowi), Apteryx rowi 
 Otago shag (kawau), Leucocarbo chalconotus 
 Paradise shelduck (pūtangitangi), Tadorna variegata 
 Pipit (pihoihoi), Anthus novaeseelandiae 
 Pitt shag, Phalacrocorax featherstoni 
 Red-billed gull (tarāpunga), Chroicocephalus novaehollandiae scopulinus 
 Red-fronted parakeet (kākāriki), Cyanoramphus novaezelandiae 
 Reischek's parakeet, Cyanoramphus hochstetteri
 Rifleman (titipounamu), Acanthisitta chloris 
 Rock wren (piwauwau), Xenicus gilviventris 
 Shore plover (tūturuatu), Thinornis novaeseelandiae 
 Snares snipe (tutukiwi), Coenocorypha huegeli 
 South Island kōkako, Callaeas cinereus 
 South Island pied oystercatcher (tōrea), Haematopus finschi 
 South Island piopio, Turnagra capensis  
 South Island robin (toutouwai), Petroica australis 
 South Island saddleback (tīeke), Philesturnus carunculatus 
 South Island snipe (tutukiwi), Coenocorypha iredalei) 
 South Island takahē (takahē), Porphyrio hochstetteri  
  Southern brown kiwi (tokoeka), Apteryx australis 
 Spotted shag (parekareka), Phalacrocorax punctatus 
 Stitchbird (hihi), Notiomystis cincta 
 Subantarctic snipe, Coenocorypha aucklandica 
 Tomtit (miromiro), Petroica macrocephala 
 Tui, Prosthemadera novaeseelandiae 
 Variable oystercatcher (tōrea tai), Haematopus unicolor 
 Weka, Gallirallus australis 
 Whitehead (pōpokatea), Mohoua albicilla 
 Wrybill (ngutuparore), Anarhynchus frontalis 
 Yellow-crowned parakeet (kākāriki), Cyanoramphus auriceps 
 Yellow-eyed penguin (hoiho), Megadyptes antipodes 
 Yellowhead (mōhua), Mohoua ochrocephala

List of breeding-endemic species 
These species breed only in New Zealand, but are found elsewhere also, so are not fully endemic. They include seabirds that range elsewhere and migratory birds. 

 Black petrel, Procellaria parkinsoni 
 Buller's albatross, Thalassarche bulleri 
 Buller's shearwater, Ardenna bulleri 
 Chatham petrel, Pterodroma axillaris 
 Cook's petrel, Pterodroma cookii 
 Double-banded plover, Charadrius bicinctus 
 Erect-crested penguin, Eudyptes sclateri 
 Fiordland crested penguin, Eudyptes pachyrhynchus  
 Fluttering shearwater, Puffinus gavia 
 Grey-faced petrel, Pterodroma gouldi 
 Hutton's shearwater, Puffinus huttoni  
 Magenta petrel, Pterodroma magentae 
 Mottled petrel, Pterodroma inexpectata 
 Pacific long-tailed cuckoo, Urodynamis taitensis 
 Pycroft's petrel, Pterodroma pycrofti 
 Snares crested penguin, Eudyptes robustus 
 Southern royal albatross, Diomedea epomophora  
 Westland petrel (tāiko), Procellaria westlandica 
 Whenua Hou diving petrel, Pelecanoides whenuahouensis
 White-necked petrel, Pterodroma cervicalis 
 Yellow-eyed penguin (hoiho), Megadyptes antipodes

See also
 Birds of New Zealand
 List of birds of New Zealand

References

New Zealand
 
Lists of biota of New Zealand